Willawong is an outer southern suburb in the City of Brisbane, Queensland, Australia.

Geography 

The suburb's boundary is mostly defined by the course of the two creeks, Oxley Creek and Blunder Creek. The Sydney–Brisbane rail corridor is aligned along the eastern edge of the suburb.

History
The suburb of Willawong was officially created and named by the Queensland Places Names Board in 1970. Willawong is an Aboriginal word meaning the junction of two creeks. 

During the 1974 Brisbane flood, most of the suburb was inundated. In 1983, local residents in Willawong and nearby suburbs began a campaign to stop sand mining in the area.

Willawong once contained a toxic waste dump, which was closed in 1998.

The median age of the Willawong population was 40 years, 3 years above the Australian median. 59.8% of people living in Willawong were born in Australia, compared to the national average of 69.8%; the next most common countries of birth were Taiwan 9.3%, Vietnam 5.2%, England 4.6%, Indonesia 2.6%, New Zealand 2.6%. 62.1% of people spoke only English at home; the next most common languages were 11.8% Vietnamese, 7.7% Mandarin, 1.5% Urdu, 1.5% Dutch, 1.5% Greek.

Education 
There are no schools in Willawong. The nearest primary schools are Acacia Ridge State School and Watson Road State School, both in neighbouring Acacia Ridge to the east, Durack State School in neighbouring Durack to the west, and  Inala State School in Inala to the west. The nearest secondary schools are Glenala State High School in Inala to the west and Calamvale Community College in Calamvale to the east.

Facilities
Brisbane City Council operates a resource recovery centre at 360 Sherbrooke Road. Residents can dispose of general waste, garden waste, and recyclables this centre.

There is a Brisbane Transport bus depot at 399 Sherbrooke Road. The  site is Brisbane's largest bus depot and can accommodate over 200 buses with facilities for refueling, vehicle maintenance, administration, and staff facilitities for car parking and recreation.

Amenities 

The Kingdom Hall of Jehovah's Witnesses is at 174 Learoyd Road.

Congregational Christian Church of Samoa is at 228 Learoyd Road. It is also known as EFKS Southwest Brisbane, where EFKS is an abbreviation of Ekalesia Fa'apotopotoga Kerisiano Samoa, which translates as Congregational Christian Church of Samoa. Over the entrance door are the Samoan words Puna O Le Olataga which translate as Source of Salvation.

References

External links

 

Suburbs of the City of Brisbane
Populated places established in 1970